Metavelifer multiradiatus, the spinyfin velifer, is a species of velifer found in the Indian and Pacific Oceans.  This species, like the other one in the family Veliferidae, is monotypic of its genus. It grows to a length of  TL.

References
 

Lampriformes
Monotypic fish genera
Fish described in 1907